The 1999 Salt Lake City tornado was a rare tornado that struck downtown Salt Lake City, Utah, United States, on August 11, 1999. It was among the most notable tornadoes to hit west of the Great Plains in the 20th century and the second tornado to hit in Utah that resulted in a fatality (the other occurring in 1884). This was the sixth significant tornado in Utah since June 1963, and one of only two F2 tornadoes to have hit Salt Lake County since 1950 (the other occurring on February 9, 1965 in Magna).

Meteorological synopsis
In Salt Lake Valley, the day began with calm but cloudy weather. As the day progressed, the clouds became steadily darker until nearly all light was obscured. Winds were still nearly calm, with the exception of a few microbursts. Hail preceded and followed this tornado, which was rated a strong F2 on the Fujita scale. At 12:41 p.m.,  diameter hail was reported near the town of Herriman. Afterwards, the storm started rotating, and at around 1:00 pm, many people reported seeing the storm rotate (forming a mesocyclone) as it moved into downtown Salt Lake City. A non-descending funnel cloud developed and traveled from western downtown toward the northeast before terminating near Memory Grove Park upon reaching the base of the Wasatch Mountains.

Damage

The tornado damaged or destroyed approximately 800-1,000 trees and destroyed temporary tents set up for the Outdoor Retailers Association convention, claiming the life of one booth set-up supervisor, Allen Crandy, 38, of Las Vegas. In The Avenues, over 154 homes were severely damaged, about 120 of which had roofs blown off. Over 100 people were reported injured and a dozen critically. In total, 300 buildings were damaged or destroyed.

At the Delta Center (now the Vivint Arena), home of the Utah Jazz of the National Basketball Association, the tornado shattered windows and tore off part of the roof. Almost all of the windows from the nearby Wyndham Hotel (now the Radisson Hotel), across the street from the temporary tents, were broken out, raining down shards of glass on people attempting to escape from the collapsed tents. A crane toppled at the LDS Conference Center that was under construction. Damage to historic buildings in the lower Capitol Hill area of Salt Lake was reported. Nearly all of the trees in Memory Grove, a World War I memorial park at the mouth of City Creek Canyon near downtown, were reportedly torn out, as well as hundreds of old trees on the Capitol grounds.

It happened in an area of the U.S. where tornadoes of this strength are relatively rare. The tornado caused approximately $170 million in damage.

See also 
 List of North American tornadoes and tornado outbreaks

References

External links 

 Satellite imagery (University of Wisconsin–Madison)

F2 tornadoes
Tornadoes of 1999
Tornadoes in Utah
Salt Lake City Tornado, 1999
August 1999 events in the United States
1999 natural disasters in the United States
1990s in Salt Lake City